Tasmania has been notable in the history of gambling in Australia.

There have been a number of firsts or notable incidents connected to Tasmania:

 First lottery in Australia through the Tattersalls company. Today, as the Tatts Group they have an almost monopoly across Australia.
 First and second legal casino in Australia through Wrest Point Casino, and Country Club Casino.
 First poker machines in a casino in Australia.
 Only monopoly on poker machines, owned by Federal Hotels, owned by the Farrel family, who also own both Tasmanian casinos.
 The issue of gambling was a major issue in the Tasmanian state election, 2018 with the Labor party's Rebecca White wanting to remove poker machines from hotels and clubs and confine them to casinos, while the Liberals wanted to give new 20 year licences to all current venues.

Casino legalisation 
Tasmania was the first state to have legal casinos in Australia. The issue was highly contentious at the time and the government at the time set up a referendum to decide the issue.

Recent developments 
The issue of gambling reform is a topic that has become increasingly more high profile in Tasmania. In 2010, anti-poker machine advocate Andrew Wilkie was elected in the seat of Denison. During the hung parliament of 2010-2013 Wilkie attempted to use his influence as a cross bencher to introduce minimum bets of $1 on all poker machines nationwide. While there was initial support from the Gillard government, they rejected his reforms.

2018 state election
In 2018, the Labor state government under Rebecca White ran with the policy to not renew the licenses of the Federal Group. This issue became a major focus of the campaign and there was a large ad campaign funded by the poker machine industry attempting to elect the Liberal government who wanted to grant the new licenses.

The disclosure of donations that occurred months after the election, showed the gambling industry donated over $400,000 to the Liberal Party to stop the changes that Labor had proposed. This was the amount publicly available, however due to very lax disclosure laws in Tasmania, the true amount was estimated to be far higher than this.

See also 

 Federal Group
 Tasmanian casino referendum, 1968
 Wrest Point Casino

References 

Society in Tasmania
Gambling in Australia